Tomas Quintin Donato Andres is a Filipino intercultural consultant, counselor, and pioneer of the Philippine-based management and training system known as Management by Filipino Values.  He is also the initiator of the internationally based management and training system known as Management by Humor.  Apart from being a professor at the Ateneo de Manila University, he is also the manager and president of the Values and Technologies Management Centre.  His Understanding Filipino Values is a book that relates the Filipino value system to the management situation in the Philippines, in order to provide a clearer understanding of those values, concepts and traditions, and to increase productivity and efficiency in business.  As an intercultural consultant, Andres conducts crosscultural orientation on Philippine culture for expatriates of multinational and international organizations. Having worked as counselor and consultant in several institutions, Andres was an adviser and a crosscultural educator to Filipino seamen and migrant workers in their moments of culture shocks in foreign lands. He is an accomplished author of books about the usage and application of Filipino values in daily living, interpersonal relationships, work, management, and productivity, among others.

Education
Andres received his doctorate degree from the Far Eastern University in the Philippines.  He is a recipient of a master's degree in Philosophy from the University of Santo Tomas in Manila, Philippines.  He obtained his diplomate in labor and industrial management from the Labor Management College in Buffalo, New York in the United States.  He received five baccalaureate degrees in Education, Liberal Arts, Oriental Philosophies, Behavioral Sciences, and Industrial Technology from the Philippines, Spain, and India.

Works
As an accomplished author, here is an enumeration of some of the books Andres has written:

Dictionary of Filipino Culture and Values (Mar 15, 1994)Managing People by Filipino Values (1988)Filipino Values for Winning Success (1989)Enhancing Organizational Performance and Productivity: Management Tools and Techniques (2001)Negotiating by Filipino Values (1988)Organizational Development for Productivity in the Philippine Setting (1983)Filipino Behavior at Work: Human Relations and Organizational Behavior in the Philippine Setting (2001)Reading the Filipino Seaman (2000)Church Management and Pastoral Administration (1999)Developing Positive Behavior by Filipino Values (1991)Dictionary of Values (2000)Social and Business Ethics in the Philippine Setting (1998)Management Filipino Style (1989)Quality Management by Filipino Values (1989)Management by Filipino Values: A Sequel to Understanding Filipino Values (1985)Understanding Filipino Values: A Management Approach (December 1981)Understanding Values (1980)Human Resource Training and Development (1980)New Dimensions in Philippine Christianity (1980)Lohika sa Kaisipang Pilipino (Logic in Filipino Thinking) (1981)Understanding the Positiveness of Filipino Values (1996)Quotes and Humor for Value Education (1989)New Dimension in Philippine Christianity: 117 Themes for Reflection and Homilies (1973)Understanding Filipino Values on Sex (1987)Making Filipino Values Work for You (1986)A Handbook of Values Education Strategies and Techniques for the Development of Interpersonal Relationships (1994)Parenting by Filipino Values (1990)Industrial Counseling: A Manual (1990)Understanding the Filipino (1987)How to Land a Job, Be a Model Employee and Be a Top Earner (1984)Ang mga Wastong Pamamaraan ng Pangangasiwa at Pamamahala - Management Essentials in the Philippine Setting'' (1996)

References

External links
Books written by Tomas Andres from the Philippine eLibrary
Andres, Tomas D. "Understanding the Filipino seaman: His Values, attitudes and behavior" (Quick View) (eBook PDF version), Our Lady of Manaoag Publishers (1991), 28 pages, 

Filipino consultants
Filipino writers
Far Eastern University alumni
University of Santo Tomas alumni
Living people
Filipino educators
Academic staff of Ateneo de Manila University
Year of birth missing (living people)